Clear Creek Trail is an urban trail in Silverdale, Washington, "at once in the suburbs and simultaneously immersed in the natural world". In a 2011 book by Mountaineers Books, it was reported to be over seven miles long. The trail extends along Clear Creek from its uplands near the Naval Base Kitsap-Bangor Trigger Avenue gate on  State Route 3 to the creek's estuary at Dyes Inlet.

History of trail creation
The trail was created around 1994 by Kitsap Land Trust and Clear Creek Task Force. In 1997, it was being cleared by volunteers and was two miles long. The trail system was six miles long as of 2011. 

In 2011, a guerrilla art project appeared in the trail system: a lifelike giraffe near the trail.

Awards
The trail was selected by Evening Magazine television viewers in 2007 as the "Best hidden Hiking Trail" in Western Washington.

References

Sources

External links

1994 establishments in Washington (state)
Hiking trails in Washington (state)
Protected areas of Kitsap County, Washington